Ygor Nogueira de Paula (born 27 March 1995) is a Brazilian footballer who plays for Portuguese Primeira Liga club Santa Clara as a centre-back.

Club career
Born in Itaperuna, Nogueira joined the youth academy of Fluminense in 2007 at the age of 12. On 1 September 2014, he was loaned out to Belgian club K.A.A. Gent.

In November 2015, Nogueira made his first team debut for Flu; playing the whole ninety minutes of a 1–1 draw against Internacional in Série A. In the 2017 season he broke into the first team following an injury to Renato Chaves; but was soon replaced by Reginaldo.

On 21 December 2017, Nogueira joined Figueirense on a season long loan deal.

In January 2023, Nogueira signed a contract with Santa Clara in Portugal until the end of 2022–23 season, with a conditional automatic extension option.

References

External links

1995 births
Sportspeople from Rio de Janeiro (state)
Living people
Brazilian footballers
Association football defenders
Fluminense FC players
K.A.A. Gent players
Figueirense FC players
Clube de Regatas Brasil players
Gil Vicente F.C. players
Mazatlán F.C. footballers
Esporte Clube Juventude players
C.D. Santa Clara players
Campeonato Brasileiro Série A players
Campeonato Brasileiro Série B players
Primeira Liga players
Liga MX players
Brazilian expatriate footballers
Expatriate footballers in Belgium
Brazilian expatriate sportspeople in Belgium
Expatriate footballers in Portugal
Brazilian expatriate sportspeople in Portugal
Expatriate footballers in Mexico
Brazilian expatriate sportspeople in Mexico
People from Itaperuna